The Encyclopedic Dictionary of Mathematics is a translation of the Japanese . The editor of the first and second editions was Shokichi Iyanaga; the editor of the third edition was Kiyosi Itô; the fourth edition was edited by the Mathematical Society of Japan.

Editions

; paperback version of the 1987 edition

References

Mathematics books
Dictionary
MIT Press books